"My Girls" may refer to:
 "My Girls" (Animal Collective song), from their 2009 album Merriweather Post Pavilion
 "My Girls" (Christina Aguilera song), from her 2010 album Bionic

See also
 My Girl (disambiguation)